Noel V. Ginnity is an Irish stand-up comedian and former hairdresser. He has been described as Ireland's last vaudeville star. As a cabaret performer, he has long been associated with Taylor's pub in Three Rock Mountain in south county Dublin.

As a comedy writer his material has been used by comedians such as Brendan Grace.

Ginnity was the victim of a tiger kidnapping in 1994.

He has two children, including son, tech entrepreuner Odhran Ginnity.

References

Irish stand-up comedians
Irish male comedians
Vaudeville performers
People from County Meath
Year of birth missing (living people)
Living people